Lawrence Edward Savage (born June 18, 1957) is a former American football linebacker in the Canadian Football League for the Toronto Argonauts. He played college football at Michigan State University.

Early years
Savage attended Howland High School, where he was a starter at defensive end.

He accepted a football scholarship from Michigan State University. As a freshman, he suffered a knee injury and was lost for the season. As a sophomore, he was a backup at inside linebacker.

As a junior, he was named a starter at outside linebacker and helped the team achieve a Big Ten co-championship. He finished his college career with 12 sacks (fourth in school history), 3 interceptions and 4 fumble recoveries.

Professional career

Dallas Cowboys
Savage was selected by the Dallas Cowboys in the eighth round (216th overall) of the 1980 NFL Draft. He was waived on August 25.

Cleveland Browns
In 1981, he was signed as a free agent by the Cleveland Browns. He was released on August 18.

Toronto Argonauts (CFL)
In August 1981, he was signed as a free agent by the Toronto Argonauts of the Canadian Football League. He was released on September 11.

References

External links
Larry Savage Stats

1957 births
Living people
Sportspeople from Warren, Ohio
Players of American football from Ohio
American football linebackers
Michigan State Spartans football players
Toronto Argonauts players